The Farglory 95rich is a mixed-use skyscraper located in Xinzhuang District, New Taipei, Taiwan. The building was completed in 2017. As of February 2021, it is the fourteenth tallest building in Taiwan and the third tallest in New Taipei City (after Far Eastern Mega Tower, Neo Sky Dome).

See also 
 List of tallest buildings in Taiwan
 List of tallest buildings in New Taipei City

References

2017 establishments in Taiwan
Office buildings completed in 2017
Skyscraper office buildings in New Taipei
Residential skyscrapers in Taiwan